Salfit (pronounced "Salfeet") is a Palestinian city in the central West Bank, and the capital of the Salfit Governorate of the State of Palestine. According to the Palestinian Central Bureau of Statistics (PCBS), Salfit had a population of 10,911 in 2017. Since the 1995 Interim Agreement on the West Bank and the Gaza Strip, Salfit, located in Area A, has been administered by the Palestinian National Authority, while continuing under Israeli military occupation.

Etymology
According to the Salfit Chamber of Commerce, the word "Salfit" is a Canaanite word which means "basket of grapes" (Sal meaning "basket and fit meaning "grapes"). Palmer in 1881 suggested the name was possible from  "levelled sown field".

History
Pottery sherds from the  Iron Age I, Iron Age II, Persian, Hellenistic, and the Roman eras have been found, while no sherds from the Byzantine era have been found.

According to Ronnie Ellenblum, Salfit was re-established during early Muslim rule (7th–11th centuries) and continued to exist through the Crusader period. In the 12th and 13th centuries, Salfit was inhabited by Muslims. Pottery sherds from the Crusader, Ayyubid and Mamluk eras have also been found here.

Ottoman era
Salfit was incorporated into the Ottoman Empire in 1517 with all of Palestine, and  sherds from the early Ottoman era have been found.  In 1596 the village appeared in Ottoman tax registers under the name of Salfit al-Basal as being in the Nahiya ("Subdistrict") of Jabal Qubal, part of the Sanjak of Nablus. It had a population of 118 households and 2 bachelors, all Muslim.  The villagers paid a fixed tax rate of 33,3% on various agricultural products, such as  wheat, barley, summer crops, olives, goats and/or beehives, in addition to "occasional revenues"; a total of  7,618  akçe.

In 1838, it was noted as a Muslim village, Selfit, in Jurat Merda, south of Nablus.

During the Ottoman era, it served as a hub for the local villages, and was one of many large commercial villages in the area that served a mediating role between the administrative center of Nablus and the smaller villages. In 1882 the PEF's Survey of Western Palestine, Salfit was described as "a large village, on high ground, with olive groves round it, and a pool to the east. It is apparently an ancient site with rock-cut tombs." It further noted that there were two springs to the west of the village.

By 1916, towards the end of Ottoman rule in Palestine, Salfit was one of the two largest villages in the District of Nablus that produced olive oil. At the time there were tensions between the residents of the village and the merchants of the administrative center of Nablus. The boys' school had about 100 pupils while the girls' school had 10 pupils. One of the reasons for the disparity was the locust attack on Salfit's crop earlier the previous year which had destroyed the village's harvest. Because of the consequent poverty and state of demise, parents kept their daughters at home to care for the family.

British mandate era
In the 1922 census of Palestine conducted by the British Mandate authorities, Salfit  had a population of 901; 899 Muslims and 2 Orthodox Christians, increasing in the 1931 census, to 1,415; 1,412 Muslims and 3 Christians, occupying 331 homes.

In the 1945 statistics the population was 1,830, all Muslims,  while the total land area was 23,117 dunams, according to an official land and population survey. Of this,  10,853 were allocated for plantations and irrigable land, 3,545 for cereals, while 100 dunams were classified as built-up areas.

Jordanian era
In the wake of the 1948 Arab–Israeli War, and after the 1949 Armistice Agreements, Salfit came under Jordanian rule.

In 1948 Salfit was the center of the Palestine Communist Party. Throughout the 1950s it became a major stronghold for the communist movement and center of anti-Jordanian activity. Salfit was given municipality status in 1955.

In 1961, the population of Salfit was 3,393 persons.

1967-present

Salfit has been under  Israeli occupation since the 1967 Six-Day War.

By 1989 Salfit was still a communist stronghold. Between the Israeli occupation that began in 1967 following the Six-Day War and the First Intifada, the Palestinian uprising that began in 1987, a relatively large number of the town's residents, about 600 out of a population of 4,500, worked labor jobs in Israel proper and in the adjacent Israeli settlement of Ariel. In Salfit there was a higher proportion of laborers who worked in Israeli establishments, compared to other Palestinian towns, because of the proximity to nearby settlements and the border with Israel as well as the significantly higher wages earned.

However, at the beginning of the First Intifada, nearly all workers boycotted their jobs in Israel and the following year, when many Palestinians ended their boycott, around half of the workers of Salfit refused to return to their jobs. Consequently, according to historian Glenn E. Robinson, between 1987–1989, a "virtual green revolution" took hold in the town as a result of the enthusiasm generated by the "back-to-the-land movement," agricultural expertise and the increase in additional workers. While prior to the uprising Salfit's residents acquired the bulk of their produce from the Nablus region and Israel, during the revolt the town became self-sufficient in both tomatoes, which were not grown at all previously, and cucumbers. Other agricultural products such as potatoes, eggplants, peppers, cauliflower and beans were grown in greenhouses while those that were not grown were supplied by other Palestinian farmers. Unlike in previous years, Salfit had supplied Nablus with vegetables while that city was under Israeli curfew. Part of this upsurge in agricultural activity was the cultivation of about 100 dunams of relatively isolated lands. In response to Salfit's agricultural initiative, Israel halved the town's water supply in 1989.

As a result of an Israeli military measure that closed all schools in the West Bank on 3 February 1988 for the stated purpose that they served to organize violence, a number of "popular education committees" were established. These committees held classes in lieu of the closed-down schools. Families affiliated with the conservative Hamas movement sent their children to the mosque-based class while those leaned towards communism and secularism sent their children to a local union building. Classes held in the mosque were considered to particularly progressive because of gender integration.

Between the 1960s and the late 1980s, Salfit's urban growth had mostly occurred eastward from the old town. The old town still served as a nucleus of activity in Salfit and the stone villas of the Zir and 'Afana clans still remain.

In 1993, the military wing of Hamas claimed it launched its first suicide operation in Salfit. In 1995 the Palestinian National Authority (PNA), which now administered the town, created the district of Salfit gained the status of governorate. Under the Oslo Accords, the city has been placed under Palestinian civil control, what is known as Area A.

In 2021 the Israeli authorities published plans to construct 730 residential units around  the illegal Israeli outpost of  Nof Avi, which was established in 2020 by an Israeli couple as a farm, on what Israel declares is 'state land'. The new settlement was to be called 'West Ariel'. The establishment of such a large settlement, according to Salfit residents, would effectively block their own planned urban expansion.

Demographics
In the 1997 census by the Palestinian Central Bureau of Statistics (PCBS) the population of Salfit was 7,101. Nearly 13% of the population were recorded as refugees. The gender distribution was 50.6% male and 49.4% female. Over 50% of the residents were below the age of 24, while 45% were between the ages of 25-65 and the remaining 5% were over 65. In the 2007 PCBS census Salfit's population reached 8,796 and the number of households was 1,840. Males and females each constituted half of the population. The age distribution was 48.9% below the age of 20, 46.6% between ages 20–65 and 4.1% over the age of 65. Over 48% of residents over the age of 12 were married, 3.6% were widowed and less than 1% were divorced.
According to the (PCBS) 2017 census, the population grew to 10,911.

Economy

Salfit is a major administrative and commercial center for the dozens of villages surrounding it. However, the route for Palestinians from Salfit's northern dependencies has been sealed off by the Israel Defense Forces because of a bypass road for the settlement of Ariel crossing the main road. There are several governmental offices and institutions in the city. Education services in Salfit are provided by four modern schools in addition to the Al-Quds Open University campus. The Salfit Governorate is also an area that is well known in the field of stone cutting and marble. An industrial zone was established on 200 dunams of land at the east end of Salfit.

The Salfit Governorate is the largest olive oil producer in the Palestinian territories, producing 1,500 tons annually. Zaytoun, the Palestinian Olive Tree Association, is active with Palestinian Agricultural Relief Committees (PARC) in Salfit to improve the quality and sales of Palestinian Olive oil. Salfit is located just across a valley to the south of the Israeli settlement of Ariel and around 1/3 the population of Ariel, about midway between Nablus and Ramallah.

On 30 May 2008 the US Consulate General in Jerusalem presented 700 books and 100 magazines for a new library at the Community-Based Learning Center in Salfit and the ceremony was attended by the PA Ministry of Youth and Sports official, Hussein Azzam, Deputy Governor of Salfit, Nawaf Souf. The Community Center is located on al-Madares Street in Salfit and was established by the Relief International Schools Online (RISOL) in 2007.

The Salfit Hospital was completed in 2006. Before the closest government hospitals were in Nablus, Tulkarm and Ramallah, all more than a one-hour's drive away.

Water treatment plant
There are a large number of water springs in and around the city but they unable to cope with the growing demand of the city. For the past nine years, the municipality has been trying to build a waste-water treatment plant to service the residents of Salfit town. In July 2007, the House of Water and Environment (HWE) of Ramallah produced a report the “Assessment of the Impact of Pollution Sources on the Water Environment and the Lives of the Residents in the Northern West Bank, Palestine”.

The plant was supposed to be built on Salfit Governorate land  from the town of Salfit. The municipality received a grant of 22 million euros from the German government to build the plant and a mainline pipe to the town but the Israeli Defense Forces (IDF) stopped the construction of the building and seized all the equipment because it allegedly would interfere with the nearby Israeli settlements. The equipment was returned only 18 months later. As a result, the town had to take out a loan to buy a new piece of land eight kilometers closer to its outskirts and another loan of 2 million euros to move the pipes and the electricity cables. Although Israel approved the new site of the plant, the planned West Bank Barrier will now separate Salfit from the sewage plant.

In May 2006, international human rights organizations were called to witness sewage of Ariel settlement running into the agriculture valleys north of the city and damaging the surrounding agriculture and environment.

In June, 2016, Salfit  and other towns in the area had to go without running water for weeks, as the Israeli Mekorot reduced the amount of water it sold to the Palestinians.

References

Bibliography

External links
 Official Municipality Website
 Salfit Chambers Of Commerce
 Salfit City Website
Welcome To The City of Salfit
Salfit City, Welcome to Palestine
Survey of Western Palestine, Map 14:    IAA, Wikimedia commons 
Salfit Municipality (including Khirbet Qeis Locality) (Fact Sheet),   Applied Research Institute–Jerusalem (ARIJ)
Salfit City Profile (including Khirbet Qeis Locality), ARIJ
Salfit, aerial photo, ARIJ
Development Priorities and Needs in Salfit, ARIJ

 
Cities in the West Bank
Municipalities of West Bank